is a passenger railway station located in the city of Iyo, Ehime Prefecture, Japan. It is operated by JR Shikoku and has the station number "S07".

Lines
Connections with other services are needed to travel further east of Matsuyama on the line.

Layout
The station consists of a side platform serving a single track. There is no station building, only a simple shelter for waiting passengers. A ramp leads down to the platform from the access road which is on a higher level.

History
Japanese National Railways (JNR) opened the station as an added stop on the existing Yosan Line on 1 February 1963. With the privatization of JNR on 1 April 1987, control of the station passed to JR Shikoku.

Surrounding area
 Japan National Route 378

See also
 List of railway stations in Japan

References

External links
Station timetable

Railway stations in Ehime Prefecture
Railway stations in Japan opened in 1963
Iyo, Ehime